Gaudencia Aoko (1943–2018 or 2019) was a Kenyan religious leader who helped lead two African-initiated churches. She was heavily involved with the early development of Legio Maria.

Early life 
Aoko was born in Wangaya, a community near the town of Awasi in Nyanza Province, Kenya in July 1943. Little is known about her early life other than that she had three siblings, was the second-youngest child, and was poorly educated. Aoko married Simeo Ondeto in 1957; the partnership had been arranged by her father. The two moved to Bugire in northern Tanganyika around 1960 and Aoko was baptized into the Catholic church at a local mission. Aoko had two children with her husband. They died on the same day in early 1963 and the couple was divorced shortly after.

Legio Maria 
The Dictionary of African Biography explains that after separating from her husband and the deaths of their children she had a vision where she was commanded by Jesus and Mary to establish Legio Maria. She was renamed "Gaudencia" and traveled back to Kenya to meet Simeo Ondeto and his mother in the town of Suna. Other sources note that Aoko did not consider herself a co-founder of the church. Ayiecho Olweny, a Kenyan politician, said that “Aoko is the bona-fide founder of Legio Maria. I have known her for many years. She was shoved aside because she was tough and radical." Church officials disagreed with his assertion.

From there Aoko worked to baptize people living in South Nyanza and preach according to Legio Maria. The church grew quickly, claiming to have around 100,000 members within a year of its foundation. Aoko played a major role in the church's early growth, and was described as a "charismatic" leader, preaching to large crowds across a wide area. As her influence grew in the region, she began to advocate for "moral reform", at times going against the Catholic church.

Aoko also had to fight to keep her role in the church known, as men tried to "marginalize" her. By the late 1960s her role had been shrunk and the church's rules were changed so that only men could be priests. Aoko left the church and after several attempts founded a separate "Communion Church" in 1971. The Dictionary of African Biography says that she "remained an influential religious leader and continued to defy convention". However, Aoko largely avoided publicity after leaving Legio Maria. She was considered a "female husband" by some close to her and had three wives and held some authority that was traditionally given to men.

Death 
Aoko died in late 2018 or early 2019.

References 

1943 births
2010s deaths
Year of death uncertain
Kenyan religious leaders